Life Is Worth Losing is the 18th album and 13th HBO special by American comedian George Carlin. It was recorded simultaneously with the live broadcast of the HBO special of the same title, his 13th HBO stand-up comedy special, and was his final special recorded from the Beacon Theatre. The set was designed to resemble a snow-coated graveyard. It is the first project Carlin had undertaken since completing drug rehabilitation in 2005.

Early on in the program, Carlin proudly announces that he was 341 days sober at the time of the recording, and that 2006 would be his 50th year in show business.

Production
A DVD of the show was released on 27 February 2007 by MPI Home Video.

Awards
The album was nominated for Best Comedy Album for the 49th Annual Grammy Awards, making it his seventh album to be nominated for a Grammy award since 1966. It lost to Lewis Black's The Carnegie Hall Performance.

Track listing
"A Modern Man" - 3:53
"Three Little Words" - 3:51
"The Suicide Guy" - 7:06
"Extreme Human Behavior" - 13:41
"The All-Suicide TV Channel" - 3:13
"Dumb Americans" - 10:57
"Pyramid of the Hopeless" - 8:43
"Autoerotic Asphyxia" - 4:54
"Posthumous Female Transplants" - 3:34
"Yeast Infection" - 4:38
"Coast-to-Coast Emergency" - 6:50

Charts

References

External links
George Carlin's Official Website

2000s American television specials
HBO network specials
Stand-up comedy concert films
George Carlin live albums
Stand-up comedy albums
Spoken word albums by American artists
Live spoken word albums
2006 live albums
Atlantic Records live albums
Eardrum Records live albums
2006 television specials
2000s comedy albums